The 160th New York State Legislature, consisting of the New York State Senate and the New York State Assembly, met from January 6 to May 8, 1937, during the fifth year of Herbert H. Lehman's governorship, in Albany.

Background
Under the provisions of the New York Constitution of 1894, re-apportioned in 1917, 51 Senators and 150 assemblymen were elected in single-seat districts; senators for a two-year term, assemblymen for a one-year term. The senatorial districts consisted either of one or more entire counties; or a contiguous area within a single county. The counties which were divided into more than one senatorial district were New York (nine districts), Kings (eight), Bronx (three), Erie (three), Monroe (two), Queens (two) and Westchester (two). The Assembly districts were made up of contiguous area, all within the same county.

At this time there were two major political parties: the Democratic Party and the Republican Party. The Socialist Party and the Communist Party also nominated tickets. The American Labor Party appeared for the first time on the ballot, but only endorsed Gov. Herbert H. Lehman, and made no other nominations on the state ticket.

Elections
The New York state election, 1936, was held on November 3. Governor Herbert H. Lehman and Lieutenant Governor M. William Bray were re-elected, both Democrats. The other five statewide elective offices were also carried by the Democrats. The approximate party strength at this election, as expressed by the vote for Governor, was: Democrats 2,708,000; Republicans 2,450,000; American Labor 262,000; Socialists 87,000; and Communists 36,000.

All three women legislators were re-elected: State Senator Rhoda Fox Graves (Rep.), of Gouverneur, a former school teacher who after her marriage became active in women's organisations and politics; and Assemblywomen Doris I. Byrne (Dem.), a lawyer from the Bronx, and Jane H. Todd (Rep.), of Tarrytown.

Sessions
The Legislature met for the regular session at the State Capitol in Albany on January 6, 1937; and adjourned on May 8.

John J. Dunnigan (Dem.) was re-elected Temporary President of the State Senate.

At the opening of the session, eight Republican assemblymen (Barrett, Bartholomew, Conway, Hall, Herman, Lupton, Stephens and Wadsworth) refused to re-elect Speaker Irving M. Ives because of the latter's opposition to Gov. Lehman's relief legislation during the previous session. After a week of deadlock, on January 12, Majority Leader Oswald D. Heck was elected Speaker with 72 votes against 67 for Irwin Steingut (Dem.). Heck then appointed Ives as Majority Leader.

State Senate

Districts

Members
The asterisk (*) denotes members of the previous Legislature who continued in office as members of this Legislature. Peter T. Farrell and Erastus Corning 2nd changed from the Assembly to the Senate.

Note: For brevity, the chairmanships omit the words "...the Committee on (the)..."

Employees
 Clerk: James J. Reilly
 Sergeant-at-Arms: William F. Egloff Jr.
 Stenographer: Robert Murray

State Assembly

Assemblymen

Note: For brevity, the chairmanships omit the words "...the Committee on (the)..."

Employees
 Clerk: Ansley B. Borkowski

Notes

Sources
 Members of Legislature—1937 in The State Employee (January 1937, Vol. 6, No. 1, pg. 11, 12 and 15)
 Members of the New York Senate (1930s) at Political Graveyard
 Members of the New York Assembly (1930s) at Political Graveyard
 Republican Bolters Suffer No Reprisals at Hands of Speaker in The Niagara Falls Gazette, of Niagara Falls, on January 19, 1937

160
1937 in New York (state)
1937 U.S. legislative sessions